{{speciesbox
| genus = Dioscorea
| species = hamiltonii
| authority = Hook.f.
| synonyms = *Dioscorea persimilis Prain & Burkill
Dioscorea persimilis var. pubescens C.T.Ting & M.C.Chang
Dioscorea persimilis var. wukangensis' Hand.-Mazz.
Dioscorea raishaensis Hayata
| synonyms_ref = 
}}Dioscorea hamiltonii''' is a species of Dioscorea native to southern China, Taiwan, northern Indochina (Thailand, Vietnam, Myanmar) and the Himalayas (Nepal, Sikkim, Bhutan, Assam).Flora of China, Vol. 24 Page 295, 褐苞薯蓣 he bao shu yu, Dioscorea persimilis Prain & Burkill, J. Proc. Asiat. Soc. Bengal. 4: 454. 1908. Wilkin, P. & Thapyai, C. (2009). Flora of Thailand 10(1): 1-140. The Forest Herbarium, National Park, Wildlife and Plant Conservation Department, Bangkok.Dioscorea hamiltonii'' is used as an ingredient in a type of chè: chè củ mài.

References

hamiltonii
Plants described in 1908
Flora of Asia